The Alabama–Florida football rivalry is an American college football rivalry game between the Crimson Tide of the University of Alabama and the Gators of the University of Florida. Both schools were charter members of the Southeastern Conference (SEC) in 1933. Although Alabama and Florida played 24 times between 1916 and 1991, the rivalry did not manifest until 1992, when they competed in the first SEC Championship Game, setting a precedent for years to come which would decide both SEC and national champions.

History

Early years (1921–1989)
During the early years, games between both football teams were minuscule, yet competitive. The first game played between the two programs was in 1916 at Barrs Field, a baseball park in Jacksonville, Florida. Alabama won 16–0. They would play their first SEC game against each other in 1948 at Denny Stadium. In a close homecoming game, Alabama and Florida were neck and neck throughout the game, but Alabama pulled through to win 34–28.

During the following decades, Alabama regularly competed for SEC titles and even won some national championships, while Florida had several lackluckster seasons with a few bowl game appearances mixed in here and there. During the 1964 season for instance, No. 3 Alabama (5–0) and No. 9 Florida (4–0) were both undefeated by Week 6 and were at the top of the conference standings. In a close homecoming game in Tuscaloosa, Alabama would score a late field goal to edge them out 17–14. Florida would end the season 3rd in the conference and unranked in the AP Poll, while Alabama would the season as consensus national champions despite losing their bowl game against Texas.

In 1979, No. 2 Alabama (5–0) would shut out a winless Florida team (0–4–1) by a score of 40–0 at Florida Field in Gainesville. Alabama would finish their season undefeated with a 12–0 record, including a win in their bowl game against No. 6 Arkansas, and be recognized as consensus national champions. In 1986, No. 13 Florida would lose to No. 4 Alabama in Gainesville. At the rematch in Birmingham during the 1987 season, an unranked Florida side would defeat No. 13 Alabama by a score of 28–17.

SEC Championship foes (1990–present)
In 1990 during the second week of the season, No. 24 Florida came from behind to beat an unranked Alabama at Tuscaloosa, 17–13. It was the first college football game played between head coaches Gene Stallings (Alabama) and Steve Spurrier (Florida). That game was thought by many to be one of the most important in the histories of the rivalry, the SEC, and college football in general as it would be a foresight for the decade and the years to come. The 1991 rematch was the final game played between both programs before the championship era. During the second week of the season, No. 6 Florida would crush No. 16 Alabama 35–0 in Gainesville, heightening the intensity of the rivalry. With that win, Florida would narrowly win the SEC title over Alabama, therefore winning their first conference championship in program history, after being forced to vacate their 1984 championship. Despite this, Alabama would finish fifth in the AP Poll and win their bowl game against Colorado, while Florida finished seventh and lost their bowl game to Notre Dame.

Starting in 1992, the SEC would expand to 12 teams with the addition of Arkansas and South Carolina. The 12 teams were divided into 2 divisions (6 teams each), creating a football championship game between the top two teams in each division. They were the first Division I-A conference to do so. Since the start of the conference title game, both Alabama and Florida have each made it 13 times, with ten of those games being against each other. Alabama has won the championship game nine times, while Florida has won seven times. Several of those ten championship matchups decided who would compete for the national title game. In the 1992 season, Alabama and Florida would finish at the top of the Western and Eastern Divisions, respectfully. Alabama entered the first conference title game ranked No. 2 in the country with an undefeated 11–0 record and a chance to compete for the national championship, while Florida came with an 8–3 record and a No. 12 AP Poll ranking. In an extremely close match, Alabama would win 28–21 following a late touchdown in the fourth quarter, securing the first SEC title won by championship game. Following the game, Florida would win their bowl game against No. 12 NC State and finished No. 10 in the polls. Alabama, on the other hand, won their bowl game against No. 1 Miami (FL), earning them their first national championship since 1979. The next season in 1993, Florida and Alabama (ranked No. 9 and No. 16 respectively) would compete in the conference title game yet again; however, Florida would come out on top 28–13, winning their second SEC title in history. In 1994, Florida and Alabama would meet in the conference championship game yet again, and Florida edged a victory, 24–23. They would meet again in the 1996 showdown, the last matchup between Stallings and Spurrier. Florida, who could potentially compete for a national championship, would defeat Alabama 45–30.

Alabama and Florida wouldn't meet in 1997, but played again in Week 5 of the 1998 season. In Tuscaloosa, No. 8 Florida would defeat an unranked Alabama team 16–10. A year later in 1999, this time in Gainesville, No. 21 Alabama would beat No. 3 Florida, 40–39 in overtime. Both teams would eventually finish at the top of their divisions and compete in the SEC championship. In the rematch, Alabama would beat Florida again, but this time by a score of 34–7. The teams would not meet again until 2005, during the first season of Urban Meyer's tenure at Florida. Alabama would beat Florida 31–3, but the NCAA would later vacate all of the wins for Alabama's 2005 season due to multiple rules violations committed during that time. Alabama and Florida would meet again in 2006 (during the Florida football program's 100th anniversary) and Florida would top Alabama 28–13. Florida would go on to win the conference championship (beating Arkansas) and win the national championship after defeating Ohio State, winning their second ever national championship.

After down years in 2007, both teams had great regular seasons in 2008 and finished at the top of their respective divisions, earning them spots in the conference title game. Heading into the contest, Florida was ranked No. 2 while Alabama was ranked No. 1, granting the winner of the game a spot in the national championship game. The game, which featured a head-to-head battle of coaches Nick Saban and Urban Meyer was competitive, but Florida, led by second year starting quarterback Tim Tebow (who would win the Heisman that season), would beat Alabama 31–20 to win the championship. In 2009, both teams again had dominant regular seasons and finished at the top of their divisions with undefeated 12–0 records. At the time, Alabama was ranked No. 2 in the polls, while Florida was ranked No. 1, which would again mean the winner would secure a spot in the national championship. In the conference championship, Alabama would dominate the game and beat Florida 32–13. Alabama would go on to beat Texas 37–21 in the national championship, winning their first national championship in 17 years.

In 2010, Alabama and Florida met in a regular season showdown in Week 5 of the season. Alabama would beat Florida 31–6. They would meet again a year later in 2011. Both teams were ranked in the polls, but Alabama would defeat Florida 38–10. The teams did not meet in the 2012 or 2013 seasons, but they would schedule a showdown for Week 4 of the 2014 season, where Alabama would blowout Florida 42–21. In 2015, both teams finished at the top of their divisions and met in the 2015 SEC Championship Game. Florida were No. 18 in the rankings, while Alabama were No. 2, essentially determining whether Alabama would compete in the College Football Playoff. Following a dominant performance from running back Derrick Henry, Alabama would win the game 29–15. In 2016, both teams would finish at the top of their divisions again. In another back-to-back championship game showdown, No. 1 Alabama would blowout No. 15 Florida 54–16. The next match-up between both programs would be four years later in 2020, when both teams finished at the top of their respective divisions with above average records. The 2020 SEC Championship Game was the 10th conference championship game played between Alabama and Florida, and the 13th conference championship appearance for both programs. In one of the highest-scoring affairs, Alabama would beat Florida 52–46, guaranteeing them a spot in the College Football Playoff. In the following season, both teams met for the first time in the regular season since 2014, and Alabama's first trip to Gainesville since 2011. Alabama started the first quarter with a 21–3 lead, although Florida came back but fell short, 31–29, due to a missed PAT and a failed two-point conversion.

Game results

See also 
 List of NCAA college football rivalry games

References

College football rivalries in the United States
Alabama Crimson Tide football
Florida Gators football